Juan Quintero may refer to:

Artists and entertainers
Juan Quintero Muñoz (1903–1980), Spanish composer
Juan Carlos Quintero Herencia (born 1963), Puerto Rican author

Politicians
Juan Camilo Quintero, Colombian politician

Sportspeople
Juan Carlos Quintero (born 1978), Colombian football midfielder
Juan Fernando Quintero (born 1993), Colombian football attacking midfielder
Juan Sebastián Quintero (born 1995), Colombian football centre-back